Yoran is a surname. Notable people with the surname include:

 Amit Yoran, American official
 Hanan Yoran, Israeli historian
 Shalom Yoran (1925–2013), Israeli memoirist

See also
 Yoram (disambiguation page)